Vijay Laxman Mehra  (12 March 1938 – 25 August 2006) was an Indian cricketer who played in eight Test matches from 1955 to 1964.

External links
 
 Vijay Mehra: A teenager drafted too early into Test cricket

1938 births
2006 deaths
India Test cricketers
Indian cricketers
Eastern Punjab cricketers
Railways cricketers
North Zone cricketers
Delhi cricketers
Indian Universities cricketers
State Bank of India cricketers
Indian Starlets cricketers
Cricketers from Amritsar
Indian cricket commentators